Lulsgate Quarry is a 2¾ acre (1.13 hectare) geological Site of Special Scientific Interest near the village of Felton, North Somerset, notified in 1997.

The site has an excellent exposure of an irregular unconformity surface lying between inclined Lower
Carboniferous (Dinantian) Black Rock limestones and flat-bedded Upper Triassic (Rhaetian) strata.

References

Sites of Special Scientific Interest in North Somerset
Sites of Special Scientific Interest notified in 1997
Quarries in Somerset